Cole–Carpenter syndrome is an extremely rare autosomal recessive medical condition in humans. The condition effects less than 10 people worldwide.  It is characterised by dysmorphic features and a tendency to fractures.

Signs and symptoms

This condition is usually diagnosed in infancy.

Features of this condition include:
 Short trunk
 Poor growth
 Hydrocephalus
 Multiple fractures
 Craniofacial abnormalities
 Multisutural craniosynostosis
 Ocular proptosis
 Marked frontal bossing
 Midface hypoplasia
 Micrognathia

Genetics

There are three forms of this syndrome.

Type 1 has mutations in the protein disulfide-isomerase (P4HB) gene located on the long arm of chromosome 17 (17q25).

Type 2 have mutations in the protein transport protein Sec24D (SEC24D) gene located on the long arm of chromosome 4 (4q26).

A third type has been described with a mutation in the cartilage associated protein (CRTAP) located on the short arm of chromosome 3 (3p22.3).

Clinically these forms are very similar and are best differentiated by gene sequencing.

The third patient (first female) diagnosed with this condition, gene sequencing shows no abnormalities.

Pathogensis

Protein disulfide-isomerase is involved in the hydroxylation of proline residues in preprocollagen.
Protein transport protein Sec24D is a protein involved in vesicle transport. How mutations in the gene cause disease is not yet clear. Cartilage associated protein is involved in post translation modifications of collagen.

Diagnosis

The diagnosis may be suspected on the basis of the constellation of clinical features. It is made by sequencing the P4HB, SEC24D and CRTAP genes.

Differential diagnosis
 Pfeiffer syndrome
 Osteogenesis imperfecta
 Osteoglophonic dwarfism

Treatment

There is no specific treatment for this condition currently known and management of its various features is the norm.

History

This condition was first described in 1987.

References 

Genetic diseases and disorders
Rare diseases